Snake Cell Andhra Pradesh is a voluntary non-profit organisation working for the Conservation of Reptiles. It rescues snakes from residential areas of Hyderabad and Secunderabad.

Organisation
Snake Cell is a voluntary organization working for Conservation of Reptiles. It was started on 2009 and registered itself as an NGO (537/2009, AP/2009/0017904). The organization is officially authorized by Andhra Pradesh Forest Department to carryout rescue operations and awareness programs in Andhra Pradesh. The primary activities Of Snake Cell are rescuing snakes which stray into local residential communities and return them to their natural habitats. Other than engage in snake rescues, Snake Cell also facilitates awareness amongst the general public and educates students about facts, fallacies, misconceptions and myths about snakes.

A team of young animal welfare activists and students run the Snake Cell organization. With a mission to save snakes, Snake Cell promotes wildlife conservation as a philosophy and a hobby. Since the organization was founded, Snake Cell has successfully attempted to save over 1000 snakes and has educated thousands of people about issues related to snakes.

Big Four Venomous Snakes
The Big Four are the four venomous snake species responsible for causing the most snake bite cases in South Asia (mostly in India).

The Big Four:

 Indian cobra, Naja naja, probably the most famous of all Indian snakes.
 Common krait, Bungarus caeruleus
 Russell's viper, Daboia russelii.
 Saw-scaled viper, Echis carinatus.

Other Venomous Snakes in Andhra Pradesh
 King Cobra
 Bamboo Pit Viper
 Banded Krait
 Sea Snake

Non-Venomous Snakes in Andhra Pradesh
 Common Worm Snake
 Indian Rock Python
 Eryx johnii
 Common Wolf Snake
Barred wolf snake
Banded Kukri Snake
Striped Kukri Snake
Buff Striped Keelback
Green Keelback
Checkered Keelback
Olive Keelback
Trinket Snake
 Rat Snake
Banded Racer
Bronzeback Tree Snake
 Asian whip snake
Common Cat Snake
Dumeril's Black-headed Snake
Dog faced Water Snake

References

External links
 Official site

Reptile conservation organizations
Wildlife conservation in India
Animal welfare organisations based in India